Geary's C is a measure of spatial autocorrelation that attempts to determine if observations of the same variable are spatially autocorrelated globally (rather than at the neighborhood level). Spatial autocorrelation is more complex than autocorrelation because the correlation is multi-dimensional and bi-directional.

Geary's C is defined as

The value of Geary's C lies between 0 and some unspecified value greater than 1. Values significantly lower than 1 demonstrate increasing positive spatial autocorrelation, whilst values significantly higher than 1 illustrate increasing negative spatial autocorrelation.

Geary's C is inversely related to Moran's I, but it is not identical. While Moran's I and Geary's C are both measures of global spatial autocorrelation, they are slightly different. Geary's C uses the sum of squared distances whereas Moran's I uses standardized spatial covariance. By using squared distances Geary's C is less sensitive to linear associations and may pickup autocorrelation where Moran's I may not.

Geary's C is also known as Geary's contiguity ratio or simply Geary's ratio.

This statistic was developed by Roy C. Geary.

Sources

Spatial analysis
Covariance and correlation